Ricky Steve Modeste (born 20 February 1988) is a semi-professional footballer who plays as a winger for National League South side Concord Rangers. Born in England, he represents the Grenada national team at international level.

Club career

After joining Chelmsford City in 2007, Modeste broke into the first team at the club, making four appearances for the club in the 2008–09 season. In December 2008, Modeste joined Witham Town on loan, making eight league appearances in the Isthmian Division One North. During his time at Chelmsford, Modeste made over 100 appearances in all competitions as well as winning the club's Young Player of the Year award in 2009.

Modeste signed for Dover Athletic at the beginning of the 2012–13 season. Modeste helped the club gain promotion to the Conference National, after scoring twice in a 3–0 Conference South semi-final win over Sutton United, as well as assisting Nathan Elder's winner in the play-off final against Ebbsfleet United in May 2014.

In May 2017, Modeste rejected a new contract to stay with Dover, and subsequently signed for Billericay Town. On 7 December 2018, Modeste left Billericay. On 15 December 2018, Modeste re-signed for Dover.

In August 2020, Modeste joined Dartford.

On 25 June 2021, Modeste joined fellow National League South side Tonbridge Angels.

On 10 July 2022, Modeste joined Concord Rangers.

International career
In November 2017, Modeste received a call-up for the Grenada national team, qualifying through his grandfather. On 11 November 2017, he scored on his debut for Grenada in a 2–2 draw against Trinidad and Tobago.

International goals
Scores and results list Grenada's goal tally first, score column indicates score after each Modeste goal.

References

1988 births
Footballers from Dagenham
Living people
Association football wingers
Grenadian footballers
English footballers
Grenada international footballers
English sportspeople of Grenadian descent
Charlton Athletic F.C. players
Arsenal F.C. players
Rushden & Diamonds F.C. players
Walthamstow F.C. players
Chelmsford City F.C. players
Witham Town F.C. players
Dover Athletic F.C. players
Billericay Town F.C. players
Dartford F.C. players
Tonbridge Angels F.C. players
Concord Rangers F.C. players
National League (English football) players
Black British sportspeople
Isthmian League players